DeWitt Clinton Peck (April 26, 1880 – December 9, 1954) was an American football coach. He served as the head football coach at the University of Montana in 1902. compiling a record of 0–3.

Head coaching record

References

External links
 

1880 births
1954 deaths
Iowa State University alumni
Montana Grizzlies football coaches
Sportspeople from Iowa